Madhushala (The Tavern/The House of Wine) is a book of 135 "quatrains": verses of four lines (Ruba'i) by Hindi poet and writer Harivansh Rai Bachchan (1907–2003). The highly metaphorical work is still celebrated for its deeply Vedantic and Sufi incantations and philosophical undertones and is an important work in the Chhayavaad (Neo-romanticism) literary movement of early 20th century Hindi literature.

All the rubaaiaa (the plural for rubaai) end in the word madhushala. The poet tries to explain the complexity of life with his four instruments, which appear in almost every verse: madhu, madira or haala (wine), saaki (server), pyaala (cup or glass) and of course madhushala, madiralaya (pub/bar).

The publication of the work in 1935 brought Harivanshrai Bachchan instant fame, and his own recitation of the poems became a "craze" at poetry symposiums.

Madhushala was part of his trilogy inspired by Omar Khayyam's Rubaiyat, which he had earlier translated into Hindi. The other titles in the trilogy were Madhubala (मधुबाला) (1936) and Madhukalash मधुकलश) (1937).

Madhushala in Media
A recording of selected Rubaai from Madhushala was released by HMV, where twenty stanzas were chosen and sung by Manna Dey, while the first one was sung by Bachchan himself. The music was composed by Jaidev. His son, actor Amitabh Bachchan, has read the verses on several occasions, most notably at Lincoln Center, New York City. The text has also been choreographed for stage performances.

Example Text from the Poem 
This is a famous stanza of poem.

Text
 मधु शाला .
 Madhushala by Harivansh Rai Bachchan. Penguin Books, 1990. .
 Madhushala by Harivansh Rai Bachchan, in German, Draupadi-Verlag, Heidelberg (Germany), 2009. .

References

 मधुशाला का मूल पाठ (विकीस्रोत पर)
 हरिवंश राय बच्चन (विकीस्रोत पर)

External links
 मधुशाला की पूरी कविता एक स्थान पे 
 Madhushala at Kavita Kosh

Hindi poetry collections
1935 poems
Indian poetry collections
Music based on poems
1935 in India